The 2013 Columbus Crew season was the club's eighteenth season of existence, and their eighteenth season in Major League Soccer, the top tier of the American and Canadian soccer pyramids.

Background

Roster

Competitions

Preseason

WDW Pro Soccer Classic

MLS

Standings

Eastern Conference

Overall table

Results summary

Results by round

Match results

U.S. Open Cup

MLS Cup Playoffs 

The Columbus Crew failed to qualify for the playoffs in this season.

Friendlies

Kirk Urso Memorial Match

Statistics 
Last updated: October 1, 2013

Goals

Assists

Goalkeeping

Transfers

In

Out

See also 
 Columbus Crew
 2013 in American soccer
 2013 Major League Soccer season

References 

Columbus Crew seasons
Columbus Crew
Columbus Crew
Columbus Crew